Punta de Rieles may refer to:
 Punta de Rieles - Bella Italia, a neighbourhood of Montevideo, Uruguay
 a former name of Villa Ángela, a city in the province of Chaco, Argentina